Beztrwogi is a Polish coat of arms. It was used by the Lipiński family in Congress Poland.

History

Blazon

Notable bearers

Notable bearers of this coat of arms include:
 Wilhelm Lipiński

See also 
 Polish heraldry
 Heraldic family
 List of Polish nobility coats of arms

Bibliography
 Tadeusz Gajl: Herbarz polski od średniowiecza do XX wieku : ponad 4500 herbów szlacheckich 37 tysięcy nazwisk 55 tysięcy rodów. L&L, 2007. .

External links 
 http://gajl.wielcy.pl/herby_nazwiska.php?lang=pl&herb=beztrwogi

Polish coats of arms